The Regis School (previously Bognor Regis Community College) is a co-educational secondary school and sixth form located in Bognor Regis, West Sussex, England. It converted to academy status from LEA control in January 2012, under the sponsorship of United Learning.

The school was located on two separate sites until September 2010 when new school buildings were constructed as part of the Building Schools for the Future programme. The older buildings were demolished.

Previously a community school administered by West Sussex County Council, in January 2012 The Regis School converted to academy status and is now sponsored by United Learning.

On 31 October - 1 November 2017 the school was inspected by Ofsted. The findings were published on 24 November which showed the school was rated 'Good' by Ofsted with Leadership and Management judged as 'Outstanding'.

References

External links
 Official website
 BBC stats page for the school
 September 2007, Ofsted report

Academies in West Sussex
United Learning schools
Secondary schools in West Sussex
Bognor Regis